The 1962 UK & Ireland Greyhound Racing Year was the 36th year of greyhound racing in the United Kingdom and Ireland.

Roll of honour

Summary
The decrease in attendances continued as a result of the Betting and Gaming Act 1960, which contributed to more track closures. Boundary Park Stadium in the Hellesdon area of Norwich closed on 1 December 1962, to become a redeveloped site for the Eastern Electricity Company. Rochdale switched to independent status and Charlton Stadium closed after difficulties (it would re-open four years later however), in the meantime their top event the Cloth of Gold would take place at Wandsworth Stadium.

English Greyhound Derby finalist Dromin Glory, a brindle dog trained by John Bassett had a brilliant year winning both the Scottish Greyhound Derby and Cesarewitch at West Ham Stadium in consecutive months. This was achieved in addition to lifting the Birmingham Cup, Gymcrack and Select Stakes and was voted Greyhound of the Year.

Competitions
The Grand National at White City was finally given recognition as a classic event; the race offered £500 for the first time in 1961 a winner's prize worthy of its status.

The George Waterman trained brindle dog Summerhill Fancy had an excellent year, winning the Welsh Greyhound Derby, the International, the Chelsea Cup, the Flying Four and Evening Standard Trophy.

News
As a result of the death of Leslie Reynolds, Wembley appointed Jack Kinsley to take up the vacant range at the Wembley kennels. This in turn allowed Stan Gudgin to take over Jack Kinsley's range at Park Royal Stadium. Tom Johnston Sr. retired and his son Tom Johnston Jr. took over his range at West Ham Stadium. Johnston Sr. had won the 1928 English Greyhound Derby with Boher Ash when based in Scotland.

Following the decision to cover all sports the Greyhound Express is renamed the Sporting and Greyhound Express.

Francis Steward Gentle chairman of the Greyhound Racing Association and president of the NGRS died on 25 September, he leaves an estate of £181,750.

Coronation Street featured an episode at Raikes Park Greyhound Stadium and a racing greyhound called Lucky Lolita (real name Black Star).

Ireland
The Grand Canal, the English Derby winner and Easter Cup returned a hero when returning to Irish shores, after winning the English Derby.

1962 Irish Greyhound Derby winner Shanes Legacy was sold after the final presentation by owner Bob McCann, for £2,500 to London building contractor Bob Gough who put the greyhound with Tony Dennis. Dark Baby went on to win the Laurels at Cork and break the track record.

Principal UK races

	

+ Track record

Totalisator returns

The totalisator returns declared to the licensing authorities for the year 1962 for the London area.

References 

Greyhound racing in the United Kingdom
Greyhound racing in the Republic of Ireland
UK and Ireland Greyhound Racing Year
UK and Ireland Greyhound Racing Year
UK and Ireland Greyhound Racing Year
UK and Ireland Greyhound Racing Year